Yassin Bentaalla (born September 24, 1955) is a former Algerian international who played as a goalkeeper. He was a member of the Algerian team at the 1982 FIFA World Cup in Spain. He is currently the goalkeeping coach at Al Wasl FC, a position he has occupied since 1993.

Club career
During his playing career, Bentalaa played for UPC Salembier, NA Hussein Dey, RC Kouba and USM Alger.

International career
Bentalaa was a member of the Algerian National Team at the 1982 FIFA World Cup in Spain.

References

External links
Yacine Bentalaa statistics at FIFA

1955 births
Living people
Algerian footballers
Algeria international footballers
NA Hussein Dey players
RC Kouba players
USM Alger players
Al-Wasl F.C. players
1982 FIFA World Cup players
Algerian expatriate footballers
Algerian expatriate sportspeople in the United Arab Emirates
Expatriate footballers in the United Arab Emirates
Association football goalkeepers
21st-century Algerian people